Robin D'Souza (born 2 May 1980) is an Indian first-class cricketer who plays for Goa. He made his first-class debut for Goa in the 2002.

References

External links
 

1980 births
Living people
Indian cricketers
Goa cricketers
Sportspeople from Dubai